Anthia mannerheimi is a species of ground beetle in the subfamily Anthiinae. It was described by Maximilien Chaudoir in 1842.

References

Anthiinae (beetle)
Beetles described in 1842